Sophie Beem (born May 4, 1999) is an American singer and songwriter from New York City. Born and raised in Manhattan's Upper East Side, she released music under Parkwood Entertainment after being signed by Beyoncé to a two-year artist development deal in 2016. Beem auditioned for The X Factor US in 2012, where she performed for judges Britney Spears, Demi Lovato, Simon Cowell and L.A. Reid.

In March 2016, Beem released her debut self-titled EP, which featured her debut single, "Skyline". The music video for "Skyline" was released on April 1, 2016, and was directed by Shomi Patwary. The EP also features "I Got It", which features a guest verse by Fetty Wap. In 2016, Beem toured with Charlie Puth on the Nine Track Mind Tour, and with Beyoncé, Chloe x Halle and Ingrid on The Formation World Tour. As of 2021, she was a junior at USC Thornton School of Music.

Discography

Extended plays

Singles

References

External links
 

1999 births
Living people
American child singers
American women pop singers
American women singer-songwriters
Child pop musicians
The X Factor (American TV series) contestants
Feminist musicians
Singers from New York City
Columbia Records artists
Parkwood Entertainment artists
People from the Upper East Side
21st-century American women singers
Singer-songwriters from New York (state)